Mount Dingjun is a mountain in the Mian County of Hanzhong, Shaanxi, China. It is situated across Tiandang Mountain, separated by the Han River, and is near the old Yangping Pass.

The mountain is famous for the battle which took place there in the Three Kingdoms period, when Huang Zhong of Shu defeated and killed Xiahou Yuan of Wei. According to Sanguo Zhi, Shu prime minister Zhuge Liang wished to be buried on Mount Dingjun, so a tomb was built for him there.

The Battle of Mount Dingjun is dramatised in the historical novel Romance of the Three Kingdoms. Later in the novel, the general Zhong Hui marches through Mount Dingjun, where he is visited by the spirit of Zhuge Liang.

Dingjun